The Woman Who Couldn't Say No (German: Die Frau die nicht nein sagen kann) is a 1927 German silent film directed by Fred Sauer and starring Lee Parry, Gustav Fröhlich and Hans Albers.

The film's sets were designed by the art directors Otto Erdmann and Hans Sohnle. It premiered at the Marmorhaus in Berlin.

Cast
 Lee Parry 
 Gustav Fröhlich as Edgar Jefferson  
 Hans Albers
 Jean Dehelly 
 Francine Mussey 
 Sophie Pagay 
 Hermann Picha

References

Bibliography
 Grange, William. Cultural Chronicle of the Weimar Republic. Scarecrow Press, 2008.

External links

1927 films
Films of the Weimar Republic
German silent feature films
Films directed by Fred Sauer
German black-and-white films